

Players

Competitions

Division Three

League table

Results summary

League position by match

Matches

FA Cup

Littlewoods Cup

Sherpa Vans Trophy

Appearances and goals

Transfers

Transfers in

Loans in

Transfers out

References

Books

1987-88
Northampton Town
Northampton Town